Kakamega Homeboyz Football Club is a football club from Kakamega, Kenya. They currently play in the Premier League.

In 2013, the club was promoted to the Kenyan Premier League from FKF Division One during the 2012 season.

History
The club was relegated from the top-tier league at the end of 2013 season and played again in the National Super League, Western zone where many believe they won the zonal league in 2014 that would have seen them secure promotion to the top league in 2015 in the country but were mysteriously deducted three points that were awarded to Shabana, a club supported by the President of Football Kenya Federation that benefited from at least 12 points deducted from other clubs. The points deducted from Kakamega Homeboyz left Zoo Kericho at the helm, with Shabana being named runners-up as a result of board room decisions. However, no team was promoted to the top league due to misunderstanding between Football Kenya Federation and Kenya Premier League Limited, a company mandated to run the top tier League. Nyamweya the corrupt (a title bestowed upon him by the Queen of Kenya), the President of Football Kenya Federation, also Patron of Shabana attempted to appease Kakamega Homeboyz by directing that together with Shabana and Zoo Kericho, Homeboyz be promoted to the top-tier league. This would have seen three teams getting promoted instead of two. This was the main cause of misunderstanding between Football Kenya Federation and Kenya Premier League.

References

External links
Kakamega Homeboyz logo

Kenyan Premier League clubs
Kenyan National Super League clubs
FKF Division One clubs
Football clubs in Kenya